Mariano D. Papy (October 9, 1824 – July 8, 1875), also known as M. D. Papy, was an American planter, attorney, and politician from the state of Florida. Papy served as the 5th Florida Attorney General from 1853 to 1861.

Early life 
Papy was born on October 9, 1824, in the city of St. Augustine, the largest city in the Florida Territory at the time. Though he was born into a poor family, Papy taught himself how to read law. Additionally, he found wealth after an overseer helped him become a successful cotton planter. In 1840, Papy, known for his memory and perceptiveness, was admitted into the Florida Territorial Bar by order of the Florida Territorial Legislative Council despite only begin 16.

Political career 
When Florida received statehood in 1845, Papy, a Democrat, was named the first Clerk of the Florida Supreme Court by Governor William Dunn Moseley. He served in this position until 1849, when he returned to private practice. In 1852, he represented Leon County for a single year in the Florida House of Representatives. The following year, Papy was elected to be the fifth Florida Attorney General. He would serve two terms, opting not to run for a third term due to the onset of the American Civil War.

During the Civil War, many pro-secessionists in Florida were became increasingly critical of the worsening economy under Governor John Milton. On January 14, 1862, the Florida Secession Convention reconvened and voted to create an executive council to assist the governor. Papy was appointed to the council of four, serving alongside planter Smith Simkins of Jefferson County, James A. Wiggins of Marion County, and W. D. Barnes of Jackson County. Though initially subservient to Milton, the council helped his leadership become more foresighted.

Papy retired to private practice after the end of the war.

Death and burial 
Though seemingly healthy, Papy died in Tallahassee, Florida on July 8, 1875. He is buried in Tallahassee's Old City Cemetery.

See also
Bernie Papy

References

1824 births
1875 deaths
Florida Attorneys General
Democratic Party members of the Florida House of Representatives
19th-century American lawyers
People from St. Augustine, Florida
People from Tallahassee, Florida
People of Florida in the American Civil War
19th-century American politicians
American planters